The Clyde Hotel is a historic hotel located in the downtown area of Portland, Oregon, United States. It was renamed to Ben Stark Hotel in 1987, then became the Ace Hotel Portland in 2005.

National Register
The building was added to the National Register of Historic Places in 1994.

See also
 Architecture in Portland, Oregon
 Clyde Common

References

External links
 
Clyde Hotel on PDXhistory.com
Ace Hotel Portland website

1912 establishments in Oregon
Hotel buildings completed in 1912
Hotel buildings on the National Register of Historic Places in Portland, Oregon
Southwest Portland, Oregon
Portland Historic Landmarks